The Jungfern Bridge is a bridge in Berlin. It is the oldest bridge in Berlin. There have been nine predecessors on its site in Berlin-Mitte, spanning the Spree arm Kupfergraben and linking Friedrichsgracht to Oberwasserstraße.

References

Bridges in Berlin
Bascule bridges
Bridges completed in 1790
1790 establishments in Prussia